Hidalgo del Parral  is one of the 67 municipalities of Chihuahua, in northern Mexico. The municipal seat lies at Hidalgo del Parral (Parral City). The municipality covers an area of 1,751 km².

As of 2010, the municipality had a total population of 107,061, up from 103,519 as of 2005. 

As of 2010, the city of Hidalgo del Parral had a population of 104,836. Other than the city of Hidalgo del Parral, the municipality had 192 localities, none of which had a population over 1,000.

Geography

Towns and villages
The municipality has 112 localities. The largest are:

References

Municipalities of Chihuahua (state)